Stormworks: Build And Rescue is a simulation video game developed and published by British studio Geometa (Formerly known as Sunfire Software). The game was released as an early access title in February 2018 for Windows and Mac and is receiving frequent updates through Steam. It left early access on September 17, 2020.

Gameplay 

The game is played in a randomly generated open world physics playground, composed mostly of ocean and small islands which lie off the coast of Scotland. The game centers around the theme of running a coastguard rescue service with a variety of vehicles, which the player can build on a ‘Workbench’ with an assortment of blocks, engines, sensors and special equipment. As the player explores the world, the in-game map is created, in which they can fast travel to locations they've discovered. These vehicles, ranging from airplanes and helicopters to boats, terrestrial vehicles, and trains can be used by the player to complete various diverse missions to earn in-game currency. It currently has three modes: Career, Creative, and Classic career in which players can choose from an array of settings.

Career mode

In Career mode, players are given control of a starting island that contains a small boatyard, a simple boat and a small house. Players will need to complete missions to earn money to build new vehicles.
The player can travel to other islands and buy them when they have enough in-game currency. These purchasable islands usually provide a larger building space or specialized building space (e.g. Terminal Camodo has an exclusive railyard where trains can be built). Within career mode, there are a lot of variables including enabling first-person play only and having limited fuel, or changing daylight hours. A small challenge within career is that crude oil can be bought to later be refined to then be sold for money.

Career classic 
Career Classic is intended to resemble the Career mode during the Early Access. Career classic behaves like Career mode, with the main difference is that components have to be unlocked using research points before they can be used in vehicles. Also, the entire map is cloaked, and the area has to be explored before it's shown on the map.

Creative mode

Creative is a sandbox gamemode where players are not limited by resources; they can create vehicles using the editor and are granted access to an island with a large shipyard and large hangar allowing for very large vehicles to be built. After recent updates, it has been made possible for players to choose their default bases, including a Heliport, Mainland (Airport or Harbor base) Island with a small boatyard among other bases.
The game also supports the Steam Workshop to download and upload community-made vehicles and loads them directly into the game. In the 1.0 Update, the mode was renamed to Custom mode.

Creative mode also unlocks the custom menu, that allows you to change the time, weather and all other things at will. You can use this menu to spawn entities such as the kraken or the megalodon. You can spawn disasters too, like the tsunami, or the whirlpool.

Conquest mode 
Conquest mode was added with the addition of the first paid DLC. This mode can be activated in the creation menu, and can be combined with career or creative mode. This adds the ability to weaponize vehicles, and a more combat oriented experience, alongside the rescue missions. The DLC added both player held and vehicle mounted weapons, like autocannons and  machine guns.

Missions

There are a variety of missions, ranging from delivery missions to rescue and firefighting missions. The missions are generated over time and will expire when their time limit has been reached; if a player has no active missions they can return to their house and sleep until new missions appear. A ‘bed’ component is also available which can be mounted on vehicles where the player can go to sleep.

Some missions will require either specific components or vehicles to complete them. Firefighting missions will require a vehicle that can tackle the blaze, and large evacuation missions will require vehicles with a large enough capacity to escort all the stranded characters to safety.

With the release of the 1.0 Update, missions were changed to be procedurally generated and the mission editor used for player made missions was changed from a simple system, to a system utilizing Lua for spawning vehicles, objects, and items in the mission.

Building

The building in Stormworks works on a voxel-based building system. Players build vehicles out of cube and wedge shaped components, inspired by toys such as Lego Technic. Buoyancy is calculated by the size and shape of the hull, fuselage, or body. Once a player has created the structure of their vehicle they will need to add components such as engines, rudders and pilot seats and program them using a system of logic gates. Engines, batteries, lights, and other electric components must be connected into a network via nodes. A logic network also works via nodes and allows to trigger different actions via inputs, such as buttons, levers and steering wheels, as well as present information via gauges and computer screens. There is minimal UI and most data is presented via player-built devices. Piping networks can be built to transfer fuel, water, coolant and oil to power engines, fight fires and empty flooded ship chambers, for example. Driveshaft networks (in the game the pipes and the driveshafts are represented by the same part types) allow to transfer torque from engines to wheels/tracks/propellers and control torque with gearboxes and clutches. Torque can be converted into electricity and vice versa. Microcontrollers are special parts which contain logic sub-networks and/or execute Lua code to allow for more complex behaviour. Players can even create simulated computers with touchscreens and custom programs. Vehicles can be connected to buildings and other vehicles to transfer fluids and power, as well as data and logic.
The game has support for land, sea, air and vehicles along with submarines and trains, with specific components such as aerofoils and gyro to support the different types of vehicles.
These vehicles can be created on Workbenches, which are usually found on either the default island or other special islands which can be bought using in-game currency. The other random islands (e.g. Hospital Island or NPC oil rigs) do not have a workbench. In addition to vehicle workbenches, some islands have workbenches that spawns in vehicles and make them static, meaning they have no buoyancy physics and cannot move. This allows players to create custom bases.

Reception

Stormworks: Build and Rescue Beta and Early access has received some positive attention largely comparing it to similar titles such as Kerbal Space Program, “Yes, as it turns out. Stormworks: Build & Rescue doesn’t just want to take the Space Engineers/Kerbal Space Program idea and throw it somewhere in the North Sea – it demands precision in all things.”

Stormworks: Build and Rescue has also been covered by Rock Paper Shotgun and PCGamer.

The newspaper The Guardian spoke positively of the game in an article about job simulation games. A fan described it in an interview as "the most brutal game I've ever played...It is my favourite game."

DLC 
Stormworks as of now (10/13/22) has two DLC packs,

Search and Destroy 
This pack adds a combat focus to the game by adding weapons and enemies to the game.

Weapons DLC Vehicles

•Enemy AI Cannon Frigate.

•Enemy AI Missile Frigate.

•Enemy AI Fighter Jet.

•Enemy AI Tank.

•Enemy AI AA Tank.

•Enemy AI Patrol Boat

Industrial Expansion 
This pack adds a new southern desert island, metal mining, new land animals and industrial sites to the game. The island is named Meiers and could have been inspired by Mexico and the West Coast of the United States of America

References

External links

2018 video games
Early access video games
Simulation video games
MacOS games
Open-world video games
Single-player video games
Multiplayer video games
Video games developed in the United Kingdom
Windows games
Lua (programming language)-scripted video games